Bullfrog Creek is a stream in Garfield County, Utah, United States.

Bullfrog Creek was named from the bullfrogs who inhabited the creek.

See also
List of rivers of Utah

References

Rivers of Garfield County, Utah
Rivers of Utah